Mi vedrai tornare (You will see me back) is a 1966 Italian "musicarello" film directed by Ettore Maria Fizzarotti. The title is a reference to the Gianni Morandi's eponymous song.

Cast

 Gianni Morandi: Gianni Aleardi
 Elisabetta Wu: Princess Liù Toyo
 Lelio Luttazzi:   Marco Aleardi
 Enrico Viarisio: Admiral Aleardi
 Xenia Valderi: Maria Aleardi
 Enzo Cerusico: Lt. Saro Spampinato
 Nino Taranto:  Spampinato
 Raimondo Vianello: Tommaso
 Sandra Mondaini: Virginia
 Pietro De Vico: The Waiter
 Giuseppe Porelli: The Duke
 Loretta Goggi: Alice

References

External links

1966 films
Musicarelli
1966 musical comedy films
Films directed by Ettore Maria Fizzarotti
Films scored by Ennio Morricone
Films with screenplays by Giovanni Grimaldi
1960s Italian-language films
1960s Italian films